Wuhan Foreign Languages School, or WFLS, is a public secondary school founded in 1964 in Wuhan, Hubei, China. It now offers education from 10th grade to 12th grade. WFLS's curriculum places a particular emphasis on foreign language training and maintains rigorous standards in the arts and sciences. Languages other than English, such as French, German, and Japanese, are offered. In 1998, WFLS separated into two schools. Its affiliated elementary school and junior high school called Wuhan Experimental Foreign Languages School, or WEFLS, which covers the 1st - 9th grades is established.  Students entering 7th grade at WEFLS choose an available foreign language track to pursue throughout their secondary education.

History
WFLS was one of the first seven foreign language schools initiated in China by the then Premier, Zhou Enlai and Vice Premier, Chen Yi during the 1960s. It was founded as a specialty school to train foreign language speakers, with the mission to cope with the increasing national demand for bilingual workforce in such sectors as foreign affairs, international trade and diplomacy. WFLS has since transformed into a comprehensive secondary school, retaining the heritage of a strong curriculum in foreign languages and cultures. The school now operates under the philosophy of "foreign language specialty, equal emphases on arts and sciences, and international cooperation (外语特色、文理并重、国际合作)," and has been listed as a key secondary school in Hubei Province since 1982. It has also gained the status of a "model secondary school" in the province since the year of 2000.

Education
WFLS attracts tens of thousands of 6th graders to sit for its entrance examination each year, where approximately three hundred are admitted to the 7th grade (middle school). Although most renowned for its education in disciplines pertaining to the liberal arts, WFLS also boasts an outstanding faculty in the natural sciences. The average score of WFLS students in the national college entrance examination is usually among the highest in the city and the province. To enrich the intellectual experience of its students, the school also provides a large collection of elective courses in addition to the nationally standard high school curriculum.  Wuhan Foreign Language School, unlike other high schools in China, has many circles(Japanese way of saying extracurricular clubs), similar to American universities.

International exchange

WFLS has established close connections with the Raffles Institution in Singapore. Every year a small number of students graduated from junior high (9th grade) in WFLS are sent to continue their education in Singapore. WFLS also has regular exchange programs with a number of high schools and universities in Australia, Austria, France, Germany, Japan, New Zealand, the United Kingdom, and the United States; they include the Manchester Grammar School in Manchester, United Kingdom, Shady Side Academy in Pittsburgh, United States, Lycée Montaigne in Bordeaux, France, and the Max-Planck middleschool in Duisburg, Germany.

Also, WFLS has established connections with the well-known elite universities in Singapore, for example, National University of Singapore and Nanyang Technological University. Every year a small number of outstanding students, usually during their sophomore, will be sent to their undergraduate education in Singapore after they pass the exams and the interviews provided by the Singapore university. In addition, WFLS has created several programs with Canadian universities, for instance, University of Toronto.

Outreach and innovation 
In 2011, WFLS partnered with the Municipal Government and the Bureau of Education of Wuhan, along with a few other leading secondary schools in the city and the province, to start an online learning platform, "istudy·武外在线 (istudy-WFLS Online)". istudy-WFLS aims to share with the public the educational resources in the consortium by providing VOD recordings of course lectures at each participating school.

Sister schools 
 Hangzhou Foreign Language School

References

External links
 WFLS Official Website
 istudy-WFLS Online

Education in Wuhan
Education in Hubei
Foreign-language high schools in China
Schools in China